Nyora is a rural locality in the central south part of the Riverina and the previous site of a public school.  It is situated by road, about 21 kilometres west of Oaklands and 27 kilometres north east of Berrigan.

Notes and references

Towns in the Riverina
Towns in New South Wales
Murrumbidgee Council